The Membertou First Nation is a Mi'kmaq First Nation band government in the tribal district of Unama'ki, also known as Cape Breton Island, Nova Scotia. As of 2012, the Mi'kmaq population is 814 on-Reserve, and approximately 481 off-Reserve. It operates a community radio station CJIJ-FM. Currently, Membertou has become the most well-off First Nation in Atlantic Canada.

History

Membertou is mostly an urban First Nation community.  Named after the Grand Chief Henri Membertou (1510-1611) the Membertou First Nation belongs to the greater tribal group of the Mi'kmaq Nation.

Membertou was not always situated at its present location. Many years ago, Membertou (formally known as the Kings Road Reserve) was located just off of Kings Road, along the Sydney Harbour. In 1916, the Exchequer Court of Canada ordered the relocation of the 125 Mi’kmaq; the first time an aboriginal community had been legally forced through the courts to relocate in Canadian history. In 1926, the Membertou Community was officially moved to its present-day location in the vicinity of Mira Road, Nova Scotia.

Membertou First Nation has been successful in diversifying its economy, featuring a convention centre, gaming centre, gas bar, business centre, a hotel and other investments within the community. The Membertou Sports and Wellness Centre, which features a YMCA and two NHL-sized rinks opened in 2016.

Currently, a business development called Seventh Exchange is being built across from the Highway 125 interchange. It will feature big box stores and light-commercial and retail development. It will be similar to Dartmouth Crossing in the Halifax Regional Municipality.

Notable residents
 Lawrence Paul - former chief of the Membertou First Nation
 Donald Marshall, Jr. - noted Mi'kmaq activist
 Terrance Paul - Current Chief and Acting CEO (2022)
 Richard Paul - Chief Operating Officer (2019) 
 Donald Marshall, Sr. - Former Grand Chief
 Glen Gould - Actor/Musician/Comedian
 Daniel Christmas - senator
 Noel Doucette - former Chief of the Potlotek First Nation.  Although he was the Chief of the neighbouring Chapel Island reserve, he was raised in Membertou and lived there until his late teens.
 Rita Joe - Mi'kmaq poet and songwriter
Charlie Herney - member of the Mi’kmaq Grand Council for over 30 years. He served as the Putu's for 18 years (Putu's is an important role in the Mi'kmaq Grand Council).

Composition
Membertou First Nation is composed of four parts as shown:

References

External links
 Membertou Community Web Site
 Native Leaders of Canada
 ShowCase
 Cape Breton University

First Nations governments in Atlantic Canada
First Nations in Nova Scotia
Mi'kmaq governments
Communities in Cape Breton County